Paul Edward Winfield (May 22, 1939 – March 7, 2004) was an American stage, film and television actor. He was known for his portrayal of a Louisiana sharecropper who struggles to support his family during the Great Depression in the landmark film Sounder (1972), which earned him an Academy Award nomination. He portrayed Martin Luther King Jr. in the 1978 television miniseries King, for which he was nominated for an Emmy Award. Winfield was also known for his roles in Star Trek II: The Wrath of Khan, The Terminator, L.A. Law, and 24 episodes of the sitcom 227. He received four Emmy nominations overall, winning in 1995 for his 1994 guest role in Picket Fences.

Early years
Winfield was the son of Lois Beatrice Edwards, a single mother who was a union organizer in the garment industry. Although published obituaries stated he was born in Los Angeles on May 22, 1941, some primary sources indicate he was born May 22, 1939, in Dallas, Texas. His stepfather from the age of eight was Clarence Winfield, a city trash collector and construction worker. He graduated from Manual Arts High School in Los Angeles. From there, he attended the University of Portland, 1957–59; Stanford University, 1959; Los Angeles City College, 1959–63; University of California, Los Angeles, 1962–64; University of Hawaii, 1965 and the University of California, Santa Barbara, 1970–71.

Career
A lifetime member of The Actors Studio, Winfield carved out a diverse career in film, television, theater and voiceovers by taking groundbreaking roles at a time when black actors were rarely even cast. He first appeared in the 1965 Perry Mason episode, "The Case of the Runaway Racer," as Mitch, a race car mechanic. His first major feature film role was in the 1969 film The Lost Man starring Sidney Poitier. Winfield first became well known to television audiences when he appeared for several years opposite Diahann Carroll on the groundbreaking television series Julia. Filmed during a high point of racial tensions in the United States, the show was unique in featuring a black female as the central character. He also starred as Martin Luther King Jr. in the 1978 miniseries King.

In 1973, Winfield was nominated for the Academy Award for Best Actor for the 1972 film Sounder, and his co-star in that film, Cicely Tyson, was nominated for Best Actress. Prior to their nominations and Diana Ross's for Lady Sings the Blues the same year, only three other black Americans – Dorothy Dandridge, Sidney Poitier and James Earl Jones – had ever been nominated for a leading role. He also appeared, in a different role, in the 2003 Disney-produced television remake of Sounder, which was directed by Kevin Hooks, his co-star from the original. Winfield played the part of "Jim the Slave" in Huckleberry Finn (1974) which was a musical based on the novel by Mark Twain. Winfield would recall late in his career that as a young actor he had played one of the two leads in Of Mice and Men in local repertory, made up in whiteface, since a black actor playing it would have been unthinkable. Winfield also starred in miniseries, including Scarlett, and two based on the works of novelist Alex Haley: Roots: The Next Generations and Queen: The Story of an American Family.

Winfield gained a new segment of fans for his brief but memorable roles in several science fiction television series and movies. He portrayed starship Starfleet Captain Terrell, an unwilling minion of the villain Khan, in Star Trek II: The Wrath of Khan, and Lieutenant Ed Traxler, a friendly but crusty cop partnered with Lance Henriksen in The Terminator. In 1996, he was part of the 'name' ensemble cast in Tim Burton's comic homage to 1950s science fiction Mars Attacks!, playing the complacently self-satisfied Lt. General Casey. On the small screen he appeared as Dathon, an alien captain who communicates in allegories, in the Star Trek: The Next Generation episode "Darmok". He also appeared in the second season Babylon 5 episode "Gropos" as General Richard Franklin, the father of regular character Dr. Stephen Franklin, and on the fairy tale sitcom The Charmings as The Evil Queen's wise-cracking Magic Mirror. He also portrayed the character of Julian Barlow in the television series 227 during its last two seasons.

Winfield also took on roles as homosexual characters in the films Mike's Murder in 1984 and again in 1998 in the film Relax...It's Just Sex. He found success off-camera due to his unique voice. He provided voices on the cartoons Spider-Man, The Magic School Bus, Happily Ever After: Fairy Tales for Every Child, Batman Beyond, Gargoyles, K10C, and The Simpsons, on the latter voicing the Don King parody Lucius Sweet. In his voiceover career, he is perhaps best known as the narrator for the A&E true crime series City Confidential, a role he began in 1998 and continued with until his death in 2004. Throughout his career, Winfield frequently managed to perform in the theater. His only Broadway production, Checkmates, in 1988, co-starring Ruby Dee, was also the Broadway debut of Denzel Washington. He also appeared in productions at the Mark Taper Forum in Los Angeles, and The Shakespeare Theatre in Washington, D.C. Winfield was nominated for an Emmy Award for his performances in King and Roots: The Next Generations. He won an Emmy Award, in 1995, for Outstanding Guest Actor in a Drama Series, for his appearance as Judge Harold Nance in an episode of the CBS drama Picket Fences.

Personal life and death
Winfield was gay, but remained discreet about it in the public eye. Prior to realizing his sexuality, he had a relationship with his Sounder co-star Cicely Tyson for 18 months. His partner of 30 years, architect Charles Gillan Jr., died on March 5, 2002, of bone cancer. Winfield long battled obesity and diabetes. He died of a heart attack on March 7, 2004, at age 64 at Queen of Angels – Hollywood Presbyterian Medical Center in Los Angeles. Winfield and Gillan are interred together at Forest Lawn Memorial Park in Los Angeles.

Filmography

Awards and nominations

Notes

References

External links
 
 
 
 
 

 

1939 births
2004 deaths
20th-century African-American people
20th-century American male actors
20th-century LGBT people
21st-century African-American people
African-American male actors
Age controversies
American gay actors
American male film actors
American male stage actors
American male television actors
American male voice actors
Burials at Forest Lawn Memorial Park (Hollywood Hills)
Emmy Award winners
LGBT African Americans
LGBT people from California
Los Angeles City College alumni
Male actors from Los Angeles
Stanford University alumni
University of California, Los Angeles alumni
University of Portland alumni